Temperamental is the third album by Australian band Divinyls, released in 1988 (see 1988 in music) by Chrysalis Records. Three singles were lifted from the album – "Back to the Wall"/"Fighting" (Aust #33, February 1988), their cover of Syndicate of Sound's "Hey Little Boy"/"Para Dice" (#23, July) and "Punxsie"/"Victoria" (October).

The album reached No. 11 in Australia, but despite heavy promotion, was the last to be released through Chrysalis. Amphlett explained: "We still owed them more than a million dollars – unpaid reimbursement of their advances for recording, distributing and promoting three albums, and supporting all those tours, yet they let us off the hook. Chrysalis knew, as did we, that we'd never be able to repay such a sum. They figured that because Temperamental hadn't broken us in the States, we were never going to make it there and they'd be smarter to write off our debt as a tax deduction. 'It's time to split', they said. 'We can't do anything more with Divinyls'."

Amphlett believed the album contained some of the band's best songs, written "throughout the emotional maelstrom of the exits of (manager) Vince (Lovegrove), Bjarne, Rick and JJ", including "Back to the Wall", "Punxsie" and "Better Days", as well as "Hey Little Boy".

Background and recording
Rehearsals began in Los Angeles in October 1986, with the band by then reduced to just singer Chrissy Amphlett and guitarist Mark McEntee. Guitarist Bjarne Ohlin had already left and drummer JJ Harris was sacked at the insistence of producer Mike Chapman, who regarded him as inadequate for the task. The band's label, Chrysalis Records, told Amphlett and McEntee it regarded the album as a make-or-break record, following the lacklustre sales performance of its predecessor, What a Life!. The pair returned to Australia in December 1986 for a series of Australian Made gigs in the capital cities, with Divinyls joining a lineup that included Mental As Anything, I'm Talking, The Triffids, The Saints, Models, Jimmy Barnes and INXS. Amphlett and McEntee were supported on stage by Rick Grossman (bass), Kenny Lyon (keyboards) and Americans Tommy Cain (drums) and Frank Infante (guitar).

Grossman quit at the close of the Australian Made tour and checked into a rehabilitation clinic for treatment for heroin addiction and Amphlett and McEntee returned to Los Angeles in 1987 to begin recording. The new lineup for the album included Lyon, Machinations drummer Warren McLean and Tootieville bassist Tim Millikan. Recording began at Rumbo Recorders, but ceased after complaints about noise by Neil Diamond, who was recording in the next studio. The band transferred to Sunset Sound Recorders with Chapman to complete the album.

Track listing
All tracks composed by Christina Amphlett and Mark McEntee; except where noted.
 "Temperamental" − 4:30
 "Back To the Wall" (Amphlett, McEntee, Richard Feldman) − 4:38
 "Hey Little Boy" (Don Baskin, Bob Gonzales) − 3:21
 "Punxsie" − 4:16
 "Dance of Love" − 4:04
 "Better Days" − 4:00
 "Dirty Love" − 4:35
 "Because" − 4:06
 "Fighting" − 3:45
 "Run-a-Way Train" − 4:30
 "Out of Time" [CD-only bonus track; not on LP] − 5:46

Personnel

 Christina Amphlett − vocals
 Mark McEntee − guitars, vocals
 Tom Lang - guitar, piano, Hammond organ, backing vocals
 Warren McLean − drums
 Tim Millikan − bass
Technical
 Mike Chapman − producer
 Bob Clearmountain - mixing (all tracks except "Fighting", "Run-a-Way Train", "Out of Time")
Hubert Kretzschmar - design, photography

Charts

Certifications

References

1988 albums
Divinyls albums
Albums produced by Mike Chapman
Chrysalis Records albums